Bowman–Zirkle Farm, also known as the Isaiah Bowman Farm, is a historic home and farm and national historic district located near Edinburg, Shenandoah County, Virginia. The district encompasses seven contributing buildings and three contributing structures. The farmhouse was built in 1879, and is a two-story, three bay, frame I-house dwelling with an integral wing. The remaining contributing resources are a 19th-century log-and-frame tenant house, a summer kitchen (c. 1823), frame meat house (c. 1880), a large bank barn (the Bowman barn, c. 1870); a barn shed, a second bank barn (the Painter barn, c. 1880), a frame granary (c. 1880), a wood-stave silo (c. 1900), and a large, two-story chicken house (c. 1920).

It was listed on the National Register of Historic Places in 2009.

References

Houses on the National Register of Historic Places in Virginia
Farms on the National Register of Historic Places in Virginia
Historic districts on the National Register of Historic Places in Virginia
Victorian architecture in Virginia
Houses completed in 1879
Houses in Shenandoah County, Virginia
National Register of Historic Places in Shenandoah County, Virginia